The South African cricket team toured England in the second half of the 1965 season, winning the three match Test series 1–0, with two matches drawn. They had a young and improving side. Their players included Graeme Pollock and his brother Peter, Colin Bland and Eddie Barlow.

The Pollock brothers were mainly responsible for their win by 94 runs in the Second Test at Trent Bridge. In overcast conditions, ideal for Tom Cartwright in particular, Graeme scored 125 out of 160 in 140 minutes, the last 91 coming in 70 minutes. He had come in at 16–2, and the score had declined to 80–5, before his partnerships with the captain, Peter van der Merwe, and Richard Dumbrill enabled the score to reach 269. He made another 59 in the second innings. His brother contributed bowling figures of 5-53 and 5-34.

South African team

 Peter van der Merwe (captain)
 Ali Bacher
 Eddie Barlow
 Colin Bland
 Jackie Botten
 Harry Bromfield
 Norman Crookes
 Richard Dumbrill
 Dennis Gamsy
 Tiger Lance
 Denis Lindsay
 Mike Macaulay
 Atholl McKinnon
 Graeme Pollock
 Peter Pollock

The manager was Jack Plimsoll, a former Test player.

Test series summary

First Test

Second Test

Third Test

Other matches

References

Annual reviews
 Playfair Cricket Annual 1966
 Wisden Cricketers' Almanack 1966

Further reading
 Bill Frindall, The Wisden Book of Test Cricket 1877-1978, Wisden, 1979
 various writers, A Century of South Africa in Test & International Cricket 1889-1989, Ball, 1989

External links
 South Africa in England, 1965 at Cricinfo 
 CricketArchive – tour summaries
 South Africa to England 1965 at Test Cricket Tours 
 

1965 in English cricket
1965 in South African cricket
International cricket competitions from 1960–61 to 1970
1965